Fary may refer to:

Fary may refer to one of the following:

El Fary (1937–2007), Spanish singer and actor
István Fáry, a Hungarian mathematician, the namesake of the Fáry's theorem
John G. Fary (1911–1984), U.S. Representative from Illinois.
Fary Faye (born 1974), football forward from Senegal

See also 
Farry (disambiguation)
Fairy